GWSN, also known as Girls in the Park, is a South Korean multinational girl group formed in 2018 by Kiwi Pop (now known as The Wave Music). The group consists of seven members: Miya, Seokyoung, Seoryoung, Anne, Minju, Soso, and Lena, and debuted on September 5, 2018 with the title track Puzzle Moon from their extended play The Park in the Night Part One.

Name
GWSN is an abbreviation of Gongwon Sonyeo. The group describes "gongwon" (lit. park) as a place "where anyone, who is male or female or old or young, can go and enjoy themselves, heal their wounds and dream". The abbreviation also has a separate meaning in English, with G standing for 'Ground' and WSN standing for the directional markers 'West,' 'South,' and 'North,' with the significance being that the group wants to reach out to people from every direction. 'Gong-won' can also be translated into 'gong,' meaning zero in Korean, and 'won,' which represents the English word one, meaning that when the seven members get together, they will forever be one.

History

2018–2019: Debut with The Park in the Night series
On June 14, 2018, Kiwi Pop, a subsidiary of Kiwi Media Group, released a teaser image for their first girl group named GWSN and the opening of their social media accounts with their reveal date set to June 18, 2018. Shortly after, members were each revealed along with a short video and an image starting with Minju, followed by Lena, Anne, Soso, Seoryoung, Miya, and finally Seokyoung, who was a former contestant on Mnet's Produce 101 TV series, where she came in 30th place.

In order to increase their pre-debut popularity, the group held multiple busking events all over South Korea in public spaces, performed in middle schools and high schools, as well as held live video events on their Facebook page and uploaded dance covers of popular songs onto their YouTube.

On July 8, Mnet announced a reality TV show named Got Ya! GWSN featuring all the members of GWSN.

On September 5, 2018, GWSN made their debut with the extended play (EP) The Park in the Night Part One with the lead single, "Puzzle Moon". They then went onto holding their debut showcase at Yes24 Live Hall, Seoul, South Korea. They officially made their debut in the Korean music program M Countdown on September 6.

On March 13, 2019, GWSN released their second EP The Park in the Night Part Two, with the lead single "Pinky Star (Run)".

GWSN released their first studio album The Park in the Night Part Three along with the lead single "Red-Sun (021)" on July 23. This was funded through fan contribution on Makestar, where a total of US$27,491.03 was raised.

On October 2, GWSN was the opening act for Jessica Jung's fanmeeting in Japan, XOXO Jessica Jung Fan Meeting.

2020–present: The Keys and The Other Side of the Moon
On January 17, 2020, it was announced that member Soso would be taking a hiatus due to a ruptured ankle ligament and that the group will continue to promote as six members. On April 3, 2020, it was reported that GWSN was moved to a new sub-label from Kiwi Media Group known as MILES. The group made their comeback on April 28 with their third EP The Keys and its title track "Bazooka!", without member Soso.

GWSN was set to release their fourth EP The Other Side of the Moon and its lead single "Like It Hot" on May 20, 2021, but the album's release date was pushed back to May 26.  The group would be moved to The Wave Music, which was formerly named Kiwi Media Group.

In 2022, Anne made her screen debut as Kim Yoon-ji in The Killer: A Girl Who Deserves to Die.

On January 22, 2023, it was announced through multiple news outlets that all 7 members' exclusive contracts with The Wave Music had been terminated on the 12th of that month by the Seoul Central District Court.

Members
Miya
Seokyoung
Seoryoung
Anne
Minju
Soso
Lena

Discography

Extended plays

Singles

Soundtrack appearances

Videography

Music videos

Television shows

Awards and nominations

Notes

References

External links

Fancafe
GWSN Official Instagram

K-pop music groups
South Korean girl groups
South Korean pop music groups
South Korean dance music groups
Musical groups from Seoul
Musical groups established in 2018
2018 establishments in South Korea